Ukraine has several well developed design bureaus that were inherited from the Soviet Union. Many of them are party of the state Ukrainian defense industry complex Ukroboronprom.

Rockets and space
 Yuzhnoye Design Bureau of Yangel (Dnipro), specialization in rockets
 Luch Design Bureau (LUCH)

Vehicles
 Kharkiv Design Bureau of Morozov (Kharkiv), specialization in armored vehicles
  (Kharkiv, website), specialization in design of internal combustion engines
 Science-production complex "Fotoprylad" (Cherkasy, website), specialization in optics
 Kyiv Automatics Plant (Kyiv), specialization in support technology in various fields for armed forces
 Design Bureau "Artyleriyske ozbroyennya" (Kyiv, website), specialization in artillery guns design

Aviation
 Antonov State Company, specialization in large aircraft
 Progress Design Bureau of Ivchenko (Zaporizhzhia), specialization in aviation engines
 Kharkiv Aggregate Design Bureau (Kharkiv, website), specialization in supporting systems for aviation and rocket technologies
 Research-design bureau of general purpose aviation (Petropavlivska Borshchahivka, Bucha Raion)

Radars
 Science-production complex Iskra (Spark) (Zaporizhzhia, website), specialization in radiolocating capabilities (Radiolocation)

Shipbuilding
 Central Design Bureau Izumrud (Kherson)
 State Research and Design Shipbuilding Center (Mykolaiv, website), specialization in ship design
 Zorya-Mashproekt science production complex of gas turbine building (Mykolaiv, website), specialization in ship engines
 Kyi Science-research Institute of Hydrodevices (Kyiv, website), specialization in hydro devices

Various general research institutes
 Ukrainian science-research institute of aviation technology (Kyiv, website)
 Ukrainian State science-research institute of construction materials "Prometei" (Mariupol)

External links
 Ukrainian Defense Industry website

Lists of organizations based in Ukraine
Defence companies of Ukraine
Ukrainian design